Condate may refer to:
 Condate (moth), a genus of moth

Places 
 Chapeauroux, a river of France
 Condé-sur-Iton, a commune in the Eure department, France
 Cosne-Cours-sur-Loire, a commune in the Nièvre, France
 Merpins, a commune in the Charente department, France
 Montereau-Fault-Yonne, commune in the Seine-et-Marne department, France
 Condate (Britain), Roman Northwich, in Cheshire, England
 Rennes, a city in Brittany, France
  Condate, suburb of Roman Lugdunum

See also
 :fr:Condate, a more extensive list in French Wikipedia